Yelena Yuryevna Dendeberova (born May 4, 1969) is a former medley swimmer from the Soviet Union, who won the silver medal in the 200 m individual medley at the 1988 Summer Olympics in Seoul, South Korea. She also competed in the 1992 Summer Olympics, for the Unified Team.

References
 DatabaseOlympics

1969 births
Living people
Olympic swimmers of the Soviet Union
Olympic swimmers of the Unified Team
Swimmers at the 1988 Summer Olympics
Swimmers at the 1992 Summer Olympics
Olympic silver medalists for the Soviet Union
Place of birth missing (living people)
Soviet female freestyle swimmers
World Aquatics Championships medalists in swimming
European Aquatics Championships medalists in swimming
Medalists at the 1988 Summer Olympics
Olympic silver medalists in swimming
Soviet female medley swimmers